Borusowa  is a village in the administrative district of Gmina Gręboszów, within Dąbrowa County, Lesser Poland Voivodeship, in southern Poland.

The Borusowa Ferry, a cable ferry, crosses the River Vistula between Borusowa and Nowy Korczyn.

References

Borusowa